Rusenu is a virtually extinct Papuan language discovered in 2007. It was spoken in the east of what is now East Timor.

Rusenu was discovered accidentally by the Dutch-Timorese linguist Aone van Engelenhoven, who was studying a language called Makuva, thought since the 1950s to be extinct. Just as he was about to leave for the Netherlands, he was informed about the existence of a language called Rusenu. There was said to be only one elderly woman "who had some knowledge of it." He gave his tape recorder to his informant, who subsequently interrogated the women and her son. She remembered a nursery rhyme, which she was unable to interpret (as was her entire tribe). Her son could count to ten in the language. After Van Engelenhoven analysed and transcribed the recording, he concluded that Rusenu, "albeit remotely related to Fataluku, is a separate language." The speakers of Rusenu were also claimed to have been responsible for the several thousand years old rock drawings on East Timor, in the Ile Kére Kére caves.

Van Engelenhoven reports this discovery triggered rumors about other languages that have survived to date as cants, and hopes to discover some more unknown East Timorese languages in the near future.

References

Languages of East Timor
Oirata–Makasai languages
Extinct languages of Asia